Great Nii-Okai Evans (born 25 October 2000) is an English footballer who plays as a striker for Hungerford Town.

Playing career 
Evans joined AFC Wimbledon's youth set-up aged 16 from Bedfont Sports. On 5 December 2017, he made his professional debut as a substitute in a 2–0 EFL Trophy defeat at Yeovil Town.

After leaving at the end of the 2017–18 season, Evans played for Metropolitan Police before joining Hayes & Yeading United in September 2018, where he scored three goals in 11 appearances. In December 2018, he joined South Park. Evans went on trial at Torquay United in July 2019. He joined Merstham in September, but re-joined South Park the following month. In February 2020, he joined Wingate & Finchley.

On 12 June 2020, Evans agreed to join fellow Isthmian League Premier Division side, Leatherhead.

In February 2023, Evans signed for National League South club Hungerford Town.

Career statistics

References

External links 

2000 births
Living people
Footballers from Greater London
English footballers
Association football forwards
Bedfont Sports F.C. players
AFC Wimbledon players
Metropolitan Police F.C. players
Hayes & Yeading United F.C. players
South Park F.C. players
Merstham F.C. players
Wingate & Finchley F.C. players
Leatherhead F.C. players
Cheshunt F.C. players
Harrow Borough F.C. players
Kingstonian F.C. players
Hungerford Town F.C. players
Isthmian League players
Southern Football League players
Black British sportspeople